Jigjidsüren Gombojav (Mongolian: Гомбожавын Жигжидсүрэн) is a Mongolian film director and screenwriter. His films include The First Steps (Анхны Алхам) (1974), The Legend of Mother Oasis (Эх Бүрдийн Домог) (1975), Khatan-Bator (Хатанбаатар) (1981), Tears of the Rock Monument (Хүн Чулууны Нулимс) (1990), Warm Ashes (Бүлээн Нурам) (1991), and Traces of Existence (Амин Мөр) (1992). He was awarded the highest honor in Mongolia for artists, the People's Artist of Mongolia, in 2007 for his contribution to Mongolian cinema and television, and the highest literature award in Mongolia, D. Natsagdorj Literature Award, in 2011 for his documentary film about the poet D. Natsagdorj.

Life 
Jigjidsüren Gombojav was born in a place called Uzuur-Shand in today's Bayanjargalan sum of Töv Province  of Mongolia, to a Khalkha aristocratic family from what is then known as Darhan Chin Wang  khoshuu from Tüsheet Khan aimag, and was brought up in Ulaanbaatar from a very early age, which was under the jurisdiction of the same khoshuu. After graduating from high school in Ulaanbaatar, Jigjidsüren worked as an assistant director in the "Mongol Kino" studio under the supervision of the directors Jigjid Dejid and Chimed-Osor Dendev. In 1962 he was admitted to the State Institute of Cinematography (a.k.a. VGIK, now the Gerasimov Institute of Cinematography). He studied film directing under Lev Kuleshov and screenwriting under Aleksei Kapler.

Career 
After graduating from the State Institute of Cinematography, Jigjidsüren returned to the "Mongol Kino" film studio to be hired as a film director. He debuted his directorial career with a feature film The First Steps which was released in 1970. The film won the Special Prize at the Tashkent International Film Festival. The Legend of Mother Oasis won the main prize at the Karlovy-Vary International Film Festival in 1976. He co-directed the film with Buntar Jamyan. Khatan-bator, the drama Jigjidsüren directed and co-wrote with S.Udval, was included in the competition program of the Moscow International Film Festival in 1981. His directorial work Prologue of the Undeclared War was included in the competition program of the Moscow International Film Festival in 1985. Jigjidsüren worked as a film director and artistic director at the "Mongol Kino" film studio until 1992. Since then he has produced several feature films under his private film studio "Hiimori-Film". From 1996 he worked as the programming director at the Mongolian National Television (now Mongolian National Broadcaster) and also served on its executive committee. He co-wrote with his spouse "The Encyclopedia of Mongolian Cinema" in 2005. The encyclopedia includes chronicles and descriptions of films made in Mongolia from 1935 to 2000, and is considered to be the only comprehensive reference on Mongolian cinema. He also wrote a biographical and historical account of Mongolian cinema in his book "55:25 The Kids of Shadow Art".  In addition to activities in cinema and television, since the 1980s Jigjidsüren taught at higher education institutions in Mongolia, including the University of Culture and Arts, and the Institute of Cinematography of Mongolia.

Filmography

References

 Bibliography

Sources

External links

Biography and filmography in "Mongol Kino" website (in Mongolian)
Profile and selective filmography: "The Vesoul International Film Festival of Asian Cinemas"
Selective filmography (in Mongolian)

Mongolian film directors
1942 births
Living people
People from Töv Province
Mongolian screenwriters